Heloderma is a genus of toxicoferan lizards that contains five species, all of which are venomous. It is the only extant genus of the family Helodermatidae.

Description
The genus Heloderma contains the Gila monster (H. suspectum) and four species of beaded lizards. The Gila monster is a large, stocky, most of the time slow-moving reptile that prefers arid deserts. Beaded lizards are seen to be more agile and seem to prefer more humid surroundings. The tails of all species of Heloderma are used as fat storage organs. The scales of the head, back and tail are bead-like, containing osteoderms for better protection. The scales of the belly are free from osteoderms. Most species are dark in color, with yellowish or pinkish markings.

Venom
The venom glands of Heloderma are located at the end of the lower jaws, unlike snakes' venom glands, which are located behind the eyes. Also, unlike snakes, the Gila monster and beaded lizards lack the musculature to inject venom immediately. They have to chew the venom into the flesh of a victim. Heloderma venom is used only in defense. Venom glands are believed to have evolved early in the lineage leading to the modern helodermatids, as their presence is indicated even in the 65-million-year-old fossil genus Paraderma. In general, one adult helodermatid has approximately 15 to 20 mg of venom, while the estimated lethal dose for humans is 5 to 8 mg.

Diet
Helodermatids are carnivorous, preying on rodents and other small mammals, and eating the eggs of birds and reptiles.

Reproduction
All species of Heloderma are oviparous. The Gila monster typically lays 6 eggs, the beaded lizards up to about 18 eggs . Comparing the different species, all eggs have a similar size, and the same holds true for their hatchlings.

Taxonomy

Family Helodermatidae
 Genus Heloderma
 H. suspectum Cope, 1869; Gila monster
 H. horridum (Wiegmann, 1829); Mexican beaded lizard
 H. exasperatum Bogert & Martin Del Campo, 1956; Rio Fuerte beaded lizard
 H. charlesbogerti Campbell & Vannini, 1988; Guatemalan beaded lizard
 H. alvarezi Bogert & Martin del Campo, 1956; Chiapan beaded lizard

Members of the genus Heloderma have many extinct relatives in the Helodermatidae whose evolutionary history may be traced back to the Cretaceous period, such as Estesia. The genus Heloderma has existed since the Miocene, when H. texana lived, and fragments of osteoderms from the Gila monster have been found in late Pleistocene (8,000-10,000 years ago) deposits near Las Vegas, Nevada. Because the helodermatids have remained relatively unchanged morphologically, they are occasionally regarded as living fossils. Although the beaded lizards and the Gila monster appear closely related to the monitor lizards (varanids) of Africa, Asia, and Australia, the wide geographical separation and unique features not found in the varanids indicates they are better placed in a separate family.

The type species is Heloderma horridum, which was first described in 1829 by Arend Wiegmann. Although he originally assigned it the generic name Trachyderma, he changed it to Heloderma six months later, which means "studded skin", from the Ancient Greek words hêlos (ηλος)—the head of a nail or stud—and derma (δερμα), meaning skin.

Conrad, 2008 and Estes et al., 1988 (using morphological data) places Helodermatidae within Varanoidea along with Lanthanotus borneensis and Varanus. However, Estes et al., 1988 understood Helodermatidae as having split earlier from Lanthanotus and Varanus, whereas Conrad, 2008 groups them at the same branch point.

In contrast, molecular studies have identified Heloderma as being within Anguioidea along with Anguidae and Xenosauridae, but specifically sister to Anguidae.

Venom 
Venom production among lizards was long thought to be unique to this genus, but researchers studying venom production have proposed many others also produce some venom, all placed in the clade Toxicofera, which includes all snakes and 13 other families of lizards. However, except for snakes, helodermatids, and possibly varanids, envenomation is not considered medically significant for humans

In captivity 

H. horridum, H. exasperatum, and H. suspectum are frequently found in captivity and are well represented in zoos throughout much of the world. The other two species of Heloderma, H. alvarezi and H. charlesbogerti, are extremely rare, and only a few captive specimens are known.

Gallery

References

Notes
 
Ariano-Sánchez, D. & G. Salazar. 2007. Notes on the distribution of the endangered lizard, Heloderma horridum charlesbogerti, in the dry forests of eastern Guatemala: an application of multi-criteria evaluation to conservation. Iguana 14: 152–158. 
Ariano-Sánchez, D. 2006. The Guatemalan beaded lizard: endangered inhabitant of a unique ecosystem. Iguana 13: 178–183. 
CONVENTION ON INTERNATIONAL TRADE IN ENDANGERED SPECIES OF WILD FAUNA AND FLORA . 2007. Resume of the 14th Convention of the Parts. The Hague. The Netherlands.

External links
Schwandt, Hans- Joachim www.heloderma.net 2006 in 6 languages

Further reading 

 
 
 

 About Beaded Lizards 
 Heloderma information
 Family Helodermatidae (Gila Monsters) 

Extant Miocene first appearances
Lizard genera
Taxa named by Arend Friedrich August Wiegmann